Nobody Ordered Wolves is a 1939 comic novel by the British writer and film director Jeffrey Dell. The book is a satire on the British film industry. It focuses on the fictional company Paradox Film Productions headed by the mogul Napoleon Bott who is modelled on the real-life Alexander Korda and his London Film Productions. The book concludes with a large number of wolves, hired by Bott for one of his epic extravaganzas, running loose through London causing havoc as a metaphor for the British film industry having "gone to the dogs".

References

Bibliography
 Macnab, Geoffrey. J. Arthur Rank and the British Film Industry. Routledge, 1994.
 Trumpbour, John. Selling Hollywood to the World: U.S. and European Struggles for Mastery of the Global Film Industry, 1920-1950. Cambridge University Press, 2002.

1939 British novels
Novels set in London
British comedy novels
Novels about film directors and producers
Heinemann (publisher) books